Paraivongius nigripes is a species of leaf beetle of Zimbabwe and the Democratic Republic of the Congo. It was first described from Harare by Martin Jacoby in 1900.

References

Eumolpinae
Beetles of the Democratic Republic of the Congo
Beetles described in 1900
Taxa named by Martin Jacoby
Insects of Zimbabwe